Mirosława Jolanta Masłowska (born 20 October 1943 in Warsaw) is a Polish politician. She was elected to the Sejm on 25 September 2005, with 7,675 votes in 41 Szczecin district as a candidate from the Law and Justice list.

References

See also
Members of Polish Sejm 2005-2007

1943 births
Living people
Politicians from Warsaw
Members of the Polish Sejm 2005–2007
Women members of the Sejm of the Republic of Poland
Law and Justice politicians
21st-century Polish women politicians
Members of the Polish Sejm 2007–2011